Mental As Anything are an Australian new wave and pop rock band. They have released 13 studio albums, 6 compilations, 6 extended plays and 41 singles.

At the ARIA Music Awards of 2009, they were inducted into the ARIA Hall of Fame.

Albums

Studio albums

Live albums

Compilation albums

Extended plays

Singles

Video albums

Notes

A."The Nips Are Getting Bigger" was originally released as a track on the EP, Mental as Anything Plays at Your Party in September 1978, it was remixed and released as a single in July 1979 and subsequently appeared on the album, Get Wet in September. An acoustic version from the Plucked album was released as a Radio Only single in 2005.
B."If You Leave Me, Can I Come Too?" was originally released in 1981 from the Cats & Dogs album. A new version was recorded for the UK version of Mouth to Mouth and released as a single in 1988 but it did not peak into the top 100 in the UK.
D."You're So Strong" was originally released in 1985, re-released in 1986 as a remixed version in the US and charted in the UK in 1987 after the success there of "Live It Up".
E."Live It Up" was originally released in Australia in 1985 and in 1986/1987 in Europe after it featured in "Crocodile" Dundee.
F."Love Comes Running" was cancelled from release in Australia and only issued in New Zealand where it failed to chart.
G."Stretchmarks" was originally released in 2000 as an album track on Beetroot Stains, then released in 2001 as the featured track on Borscht EP.

References

Discographies of Australian artists